Sofia Kosma (born November 15, 1993 in Athens, Greece) is a female professional volleyball player from Greece, who has been a member of the Greece women's national volleyball team. At club level, she played for Olympiacos Piraeus from 2011 to 2015, winning 3 Greek Championships and 4 Greek Cups.

Sporting achievements

National championships
 2012/2013  Greek Championship, with Olympiacos Piraeus
 2013/2014  Greek Championship, with Olympiacos Piraeus
 2014/2015  Greek Championship, with Olympiacos Piraeus

National cups
 2011/2012  Greek Cup, with Olympiacos Piraeus
 2012/2013  Greek Cup, with Olympiacos Piraeus
 2013/2014  Greek Cup, with Olympiacos Piraeus
 2014/2015  Greek Cup, with Olympiacos Piraeus

Individuals
 2012 Greek Cup Final Four: MVP

References

External links
 profile at greekvolley.gr 
 profile at CEV web site at cev.lu

1993 births
Living people
Olympiacos Women's Volleyball players
Panathinaikos Women's Volleyball players
Greek women's volleyball players
Volleyball players from Athens
21st-century Greek women